The J1–J2 model is a quantum spin model like the Heisenberg model but also includes a term for the interaction between next-nearest neighbor spins.

Hamiltonian
In this model, the term  represents the usual nearest-neighbor interaction as seen in the Heisenberg model, and  represents the exchange interaction to the next nearest-neighbor.

See also
Spin model
Heisenberg model (quantum)
Hubbard model
t-J model
Majumdar–Ghosh model

References

Spin models
Quantum magnetism